WEFL (760 AM "Deportes 760") is a commercial radio station licensed to Tequesta, Florida, and serving the West Palm Beach area.  It has a Spanish-language sports radio format, with most programming supplied by the TUDN Radio Network.  The station is owned by Good Karma Broadcasting.

By day, WEFL is powered at 3,000 watts.  Because 760 AM is a clear channel frequency reserved for Class A WJR Detroit, WEFL must reduce power at night to 1,500 watts to avoid interference.  It uses a directional antenna at all times, with a three-tower array.  The transmitter is off Island Way in Jupiter, Florida, near the Florida Turnpike (Interstate 95).

History
The station went on the air as WBDO on June 22, 1998.

On February 27, 2001, the station changed its call sign to the current WEFL.

On September 8, 2019, ESPN Deportes Radio flipped to TUDN Radio.

References

External links
ESPN Deportes 760 Online

EFL
Radio stations established in 1998
Spanish-language radio stations in Florida
Sports radio stations in the United States
1998 establishments in Florida